Governor Richards may refer to:

Ann Richards (1933–2006), 45th Governor of Texas
Arthur Richards, 1st Baron Milverton (1885–1978), Governor of North Borneo, Gambia, Fiji, Jamaica, and Nigeria for various periods between 1930 and 1948
DeForest Richards (1846–1903), 5th Governor of Wyoming
Edmund Charles Smith Richards (1889–1955), Governor of Nyasaland from 1942 to 1947
Francis Richards (diplomat) (born 1945), Governor of Gibraltar from 2003 to 2006
John Gardiner Richards Jr. (1864–1941), 96th Governor of South Carolina
William A. Richards (1849–1912), 4th Governor of Wyoming